, spelled as natto in standard English language use, is a traditional Japanese food made from whole soybeans that have been fermented with Bacillus subtilis var. natto. It is often served as a breakfast food with rice. It is served with karashi mustard, soy or tare sauce, and sometimes Japanese bunching onion. Within Japan, nattō is most popular in the eastern regions, including Kantō, Tōhoku, and Hokkaido.

Nattō is often considered an acquired taste because of its powerful smell, strong flavor, and sticky, slimy texture. A 2009 survey revealed that 70% of Japanese people find the taste pleasant, and others who may not find the taste of the food pleasant still eat it out of habit.

History
Sources differ about the earliest origin of nattō. One theory is that nattō was codeveloped in multiple locations in the distant past, since it is simple to make with ingredients and tools commonly available in Japan since ancient times.

Legendary origins 

One story about the origin of nattō attributes it to the samurai Minamoto no Yoshiie (1039–1106), who was on a campaign in northeastern Japan between 1086 AD and 1088 AD. One day, his troops were attacked while boiling soybeans for their horses. They hurriedly packed up the beans, and did not open the straw bags until a few days later, by which time the beans had fermented. The soldiers ate it anyway, and liked the taste, so they offered some to Yoshiie, who also liked the taste.

Another story involves Prince Shotoku (574–622), who is said to have wrapped the leftovers of boiled soybeans in straw bags for his horse. As people happened to eat these fermented beans and found them delicious, this type of fermented stringy beans soon gained popularity in Japan because of its unique taste and strong flavor.

Chinese douchi 
Before nattō, there was a similar dish of fermented black soybeans food in China called 豉 (chǐ) or douchi . These are salted, fermented-and-aged whole soybean seasonings or condiments invented in China and spread throughout East Asia. It is usually made from fermented soybeans and with an ample amount of salt; however, the ingredients and producing method differ in Japan. Chinese use both black and yellow soybeans to produce douchi whereas Japanese nattō only uses yellow soybeans. The amount of salt used also makes difference between douchi and nattō on their taste and appearance.

The cultivation method of soybeans and rice was imported from China to Japan during the Yayoi period, and later on, the circulation of salt began to flourish in Japan. This provided an opportunity for the production of douchi to become popular in Japan. Because salt was expensive and valuable at the time, it has been suggested that nattō was invented by accident during the production of douchi. 

A wooden slip was excavated in Heijō-kyō, which had the Chinese character 豉 written on it. The excavation of the slip is considered an evidence to support the hypothesis that the invention of nattō was based on the Chinese douchi imported to Japan.

The Chinese character 豉 entered Japan in the 8th century. It was pronounced "kuki" until the 11th century, when nattō became a new name for fermented soybeans.

Commercialization in the Taisho period

A change in the production of nattō occurred in the Taishō period (1912–1926), when researchers discovered a way to produce a nattō starter culture containing Bacillus subtilis without the need for straw, thereby simplifying the commercial production of nattō and enabling more consistent results.

Nutrition 

Nattō is 55% water, 13% carbohydrates, 19% protein, and 11% fat (table). In a 100 gram (3.5 oz) reference amount, nattō supplies 211 calories and is a rich source (20% or more of the Daily Value, DV) of several dietary minerals, especially iron (66% DV) and manganese (73% DV), and vitamin K (22% DV). Nattō contains some B vitamins and vitamin C in moderate amounts (table).

Appearance and consumption
Nattō has a distinctive odor, somewhat akin to a pungent aged cheese. Stirring nattō produces many sticky strings. The dish is eaten cold with rice, mixed with the included soy sauce or karashi mustard. Other ingredients such as long onion or kimchi are often added.

Nattō is frequently eaten as nattō gohan (nattō on rice). Nattō is occasionally used in other foods, such as nattō sushi (nattōmaki), nattō toast, in miso soup, tamagoyaki, salad, as an ingredient in okonomiyaki, chahan, or even with spaghetti. Sometimes soybeans are crushed before fermenting.

Many find the taste unpleasant and smelly while others relish it as a delicacy. Nattō is more popular in some areas of Japan than in others. Nattō is known to be popular in the eastern Kantō region, but less popular in Kansai.

For those who dislike the smell and texture of natto, "dried natto" and "fried natto" were developed around 1990. The smell and stickiness are reduced, making it easier to eat for those who do not like conventional natto. Another type of fermented soybeans called "Mamenoka (豆乃香)" has also been developed by improving the soybean and natto bacillus varieties to make it less sticky.

Production process
Nattō is made from soybeans, typically nattō soybeans. Smaller beans are preferred, as the fermentation process will be able to reach the center of the bean more easily. The beans are washed and soaked in water for 12 to 20 hours to increase their size. Next, the soybeans are steamed for six hours, although a pressure cooker may be used to reduce the time. The beans are mixed with the bacterium Bacillus subtilis, known as nattō-kin in Japanese. From this point on, care must be taken to keep the ingredients away from impurities and other bacteria. Afterward, the nattō is cooled, then aged in a refrigerator for up to one week to allow the development of stringiness.

In nattō-making facilities, these processing steps have to be done while avoiding incidents in which soybeans are touched by workers. Even though workers use B. subtilis natto as the starting culture, which can suppress some undesired bacterial growth, workers pay extra-close attention not to introduce skin flora onto soybeans.

End product
Mass-produced nattō is sold in small polystyrene containers. A typical package contains two, three, or occasionally four containers, each 40 to 50 g. One container typically complements a small bowl of rice.

Nattō odor comes from diacetyl and pyrazines, but if it is allowed to ferment too long, then ammonia is released.

Related products
Many countries around Asia also produce similar traditional soybean foods fermented with other bacteria and fungi, such as shuǐdòuchǐ (水豆豉) of China, cheonggukjang (청국장) of Korea, tempeh of Indonesia, thuanao (ถั่วเน่า) of Thailand, kinema of Nepal and the Himalayan regions of West Bengal and Sikkim, tungrymbai of Meghalaya, hawaijaar of Manipur, bekang um of Mizoram, akhuni of Nagaland, and piak of Arunachal Pradesh, India.

Gallery

See also

 
 
 
  Other fermented soy foods include soy sauce, Japanese miso and fermented tofu.
 
 
 
 Kinema -traditional Nepalese food made from fermented soybean

References

Fermented soy-based foods
Japanese cuisine terms
Japanese inventions
Japanese cuisine
Buddhist cuisine
Articles containing video clips